William Lewis is a former Canadian figure skater. He was the 1949 and 1952 silver and 1950-51 national bronze medalist.

Results

References

 skatabase

Canadian male single skaters